Connecticut Scenic Byways are scenic byways that have been officially designated by the State of Connecticut in the state.  The law creating scenic byways by the state came into effect in 1989.

Connecticut Scenic Byways

References

External links
State map of Scenic Byways

Scenic Byways
Connecticut